Greater Letaba Local Municipality is located in the Mopani District Municipality of Limpopo province, South Africa. The seat of Greater Letaba Local Municipality is Modjadjiskloof.

Main places
The 2001 census divided the municipality into the following main places:

Politics 
The municipal council consists of sixty members elected by mixed-member proportional representation. Thirty councillors are elected by first-past-the-post voting in thirty wards, while the remaining thirty are chosen from party lists so that the total number of party representatives is proportional to the number of votes received. In the election of 3 August 2016 the African National Congress (ANC) won a majority of forty-six seats on the council.
The following table shows the results of the election.

References

External links 
 Official homepage

Local municipalities of the Mopani District Municipality